Tatiana Viktorovna Butskaya (born 1 November 1970, Krasnoyarsk) is a Russian political figure and a deputy of the 8th State Duma. In 1999 she graduated from the Russian National Research Medical University. In 2004, she was awarded a Candidate of Sciences degree in medicine. In 2018, Butskaya co-founded the Council of Mothers Russian Public Organisation. She is also a member of the All-Russia People's Front.

Since 2021, she has served as a deputy of the 8th State Duma from the Perovo constituency.

References

1975 births
Living people
Politicians from Moscow
United Russia politicians
21st-century Russian women politicians
Eighth convocation members of the State Duma (Russian Federation)